The Hang (plural form: Hanghang) is a type of musical instrument called a handpan, fitting into the  idiophone class and based on the Caribbean steelpan instrument. It was created by Felix Rohner and Sabina Schärer in Bern, Switzerland. The name of their company is PANArt Hangbau AG. The Hang is sometimes referred to as a hang drum, but the inventors consider this a misnomer and strongly discourage its use.
 
The instrument is constructed from two half-shells of deep drawn, nitrided steel sheet glued together at the rim leaving the inside hollow and creating the shape of a convex lens. The top ("Ding") side has a center 'note' hammered into it and seven or eight 'tone fields' hammered around the center.  The bottom ("Gu") is a plain surface that has a rolled hole in the center with a tuned note that can be created when the rim is struck.

The Hang uses some of the same basic physical principles as a steelpan, but modified in such a way as to act as a Helmholtz resonator. The creation of the Hang was the result of many years of research on the steelpan and other instruments. The inventors of the Hang have continued to refine the shape and materials and have produced several variations over the years.

The name Hang comes from a Bernese German word that has a double-meaning, one of which is hand and the other hillside referring to its convex shape. It is a registered trademark and property of PANArt Hangbau AG.

Growth of a worldwide interest in the Hang created a group of similar instruments that are referred to as handpans, a term coined in 2007 by the American steelpan producer Pantheon Steel.

Playing the Hang

The Hang is typically played resting on the player's lap. The Hang is generally played with the hands and fingers instead of mallets. This lighter means of playing produces an overtone-rich sound that could be considered softer and warmer than the bright sound of a mallet-based traditional steelpan.

The top (Ding) side of the Hang, depending on how it is played, can sound like a harp, bells, or harmonically tuned steelpans. The notes are laid out in a cross pattern in the tone circle from low to high so that with a specific orientation of the Hang, the player can ascend or descend the scale by alternating using the left and right hands to strike the tone fields. Each tone field has multiple overtones oriented specifically in the flattened field with a dome at the center. Typically there is a fundamental tone, an overtone tuned to an octave above that fundamental, and an additional overtone a perfect fifth above that octave (twelfth or tritave). The orientation is fairly consistent across the fields on each Hang so that the overtones can be highlighted, muted, or extracted based on how and where the player strikes the tone field.

The bottom side of the Hang has a round opening, the Gu, producing together with the air in the cavity a Helmholtz resonance similar to a ghatam or an udu. In the second generation, Integral Hang and Free Integral Hang adjustment of the size of the Gu (by partially blocking it with either a hand, or the legs) can generate a sympathetic D2 from the Helmholtz resonance, which introduces subtle layers of cross complexities in the resonance of the instrument as notes are played on the Ding side. In the first- and second-generation models there is a single high note with a long sustain that can be generated by striking the rim of the hole on the 'Gu' side. In the Integral Hang there are two notes that can be generated (F and F). The Hang can also be used as a friction idiophone. Shaker-like sounds can be made by sliding a hand across the surface, and it can also ring like a singing bowl by using skin (a hand) or a bow.

Sound examples

Creation and development

The Hang was developed in the year 2000 and introduced at the Musikmesse Frankfurt in 2001. The two deep drawn steel hemispheres of the Hang are hardened by a process known as gas nitridization. The side considered the bottom has an opening (Gu) in the center, which allows the generation of the bass note through Helmholtz resonance. When it is played in a damped way it can change in pitch similar to a talking drum. On the top are seven or eight notes arranged in a tone circle in zigzag fashion from low to high. All are tuned harmonically (with fundamental, octave and the fifth above the octave) around a low note (Ding) at the center of the tone circle. Each creation is numbered and signed.

There are only two people who built Hanghang, the inventors Felix Rohner and Sabina Schärer. They have a small workshop in Bern where every Hang has been created.

First generation
From 2001 to 2005 the first generation Hang was offered in multiple scales ranging up to 45 different sound models. The Hang makers took their initial inspiration from ethnomusicological roots with models such as the Aeolian, Ake Bono, Hijaz, Melog, Pygmy, and Zhi Diao. From 2001 to 2004 each Hang had eight tone fields in the circle. In 2005 PANArt was able to lower the tones on the Hang significantly in what they referred to as the Low Hang with the Ding tuned to F3, E3 or E3. It was offered in two versions with eight or seven tone fields in the circle. In the first generation each creation was numbered, the name of the sound model was written, and a signature of either Felix Rohner or Sabina Schärer was on a small note pasted on the inside of the top (Ding) surface.

Second generation

In the spring of 2006 the Hang makers presented a new generation of Hang. The new generation instruments (often referred to as second generation) have a surface coating of annealed brass over the nitrided steel as well as a ring of brass around the circumference of the Hang. From the many different scales the Hang makers reduced to a structure with one type of central note (Ding) at D3. All new generation models have two A notes (A3 and A4) as well as another D (D4) in the tone circle around the Ding. The remaining notes were mixed into several different configurations. The majority of second generation Hanghang were built with seven tone fields in the circle. Older Hanghang had tone fields with the oval indentation oriented radially towards the Ding, with the 2007 models (as well as the Integral Hang) the tone fields are angled at about 45° from a line drawn from the Ding to the edge. They also started marking the individual serial number on the inside of the Gu opening and signing each Hang at the outside edge of the Gu side of the Hang. No sound model names were officially given to the second generation models.

Integral Hang
In the spring of 2008 the Hang makers announced a new version, the Integral Hang. Numbers began again with an H in front (H1, H2, etc.) and with the first Integral Hang dated in November 2007. Several changes marked the Integral Hang. There was only one scale with seven tone fields in the cycle (D3 Ding, A3, B3, C4, D4, E4, F4, A4) and no other sound models offered. The Gu hole was adjusted to a subtly oval shape to improve the tuning of the three partials D5, F5 and an F5 of the Gu neck. Significant changes were made to the Ding (center note on the top). A circular indentation in the dome was made and has a texture of brass applied, annealed, and then lacquered. Also changes to the shoulder area between the flattened area of the Ding and the notes in the tone circle were implemented so that the transition was more gradual than in the 2nd generation Hanghang. The PANArt logo, serial number, date of finalization, and signatures of the Hang makers were placed on Gu side of the Hang near the equator where the two shells meet.

By developing the Integral Hang, Rohner and Schärer distanced themselves from the idea of building an instrument for the needs of professional musicians. Their aims and ambitions were published in a 'Letter from the Hangbauhaus':

Free Integral Hang
This model has been available since April 2010. Compared to its predecessor, the Free Integral Hang features a few construction changes. First of all, there is no longer a brass ring around the seam connecting the ding and gu shells. Furthermore, the dome of the ding is not brass-coated anymore and is characterized by a double offset (a triple dome). The Free Integral Hanghang are tuned without the use of tuning devices. The pitch of the Ding differs from one instrument to another and varies around the tone D3. The tones in the tone circle relative to the Ding correspond to those of the Integral Hang.

In the free tuning of a Hang, the focus is not about the precise mathematical frequency ratios of the partials of a tone field, but on the impact of the entire sound. Trinidad's steelpan tuners already slightly detuned partial tones to attain the characteristic sound of their own instruments. In an acoustic-mathematical analysis, Anthony Achong substantiated that this detuning is the most important parameter in influencing the structure of a steelpan tone: the duration of the partials as well as the amplitude and frequency modulations. By foregoing a tuning device for the Free Integral Hang, the Hang tuners are free to systematically make use of this parameter and to concentrate on the artistic design of the sound structure during the entire tuning process.

Termination of Hang manufacturing and development of new Pang instruments
As of December 2013 PANArt announced that the Hang would no longer be made, as the PANArt tuners were completely concentrated on a new different instrument, the Gubal. In the following years PANArt developed a number of other instruments called Hang Gudu, Hang Urgu, Hang Bal and Hang Gede as well as a number of string instruments and created a collective improvised music form played with these Pang instruments.

See also 
 Steelpan
 Handpan (musical instruments which were inspired by Hang)

Notes

External links 
PANArt website
Hang Library 

 . Documentary about the first generation Hang by Thibaut Castan and Véronice Pagnon, France 2006.

Idiophones struck directly
Struck idiophones played by hand
20th-century percussion instruments
Pitched percussion instruments
Swiss inventions